Corystosiren is an extinct genus of dugongid sirenian mammal which existed in the waters of the Caribbean Basin during the early Pliocene. Fossils have been found in the Yucatán Peninsula, Mexico, and Florida.

References

Pliocene sirenians
Fossil taxa described in 1990
Prehistoric placental genera